The National Capital Presbytery is a judicatory of the Presbyterian Church (USA) based in Rockville, Maryland. The presbytery oversees 108 churches in two Mid-Atlantic states (Maryland, and Virginia) and the District of Columbia. NCP is a presbytery of the Synod of the Mid-Atlantic.

History

Mission Networks of the National Capital Presbytery
Mission Networks are groups of at least seven churches that come together around an issue or a concern so that they can work in collaboration.  Currently there are four Mission Networks of the Presbytery.  These networks are overseen by the Mission Coordination Committee of the National Capital Presbytery.  The networks are Global Mission Network, Earth Care Network,
Israel Palestine Network, and 
Refugee Network.

See also
 Presbyterian polity

References

External links 

Presbyterian Church (USA) presbyteries
History of Maryland
History of North Carolina
History of Virginia
History of West Virginia